is a 1989 Japanese horror film directed by  and starring Eri Fukatsu. It was released in Japan on April 8, 1989.

Cast
Eri Fukatsu
Yasufumi Terawaki
Akiko Matsumura

Terumi Yamamoto
Akemi Imamura

Reception
At the 13th Japan Academy Prize, Eri Fukatsu won the award for Best Newcomer. At the 1989 Fantafestival,  won the award for Best Director and Eri Fukatsu won the award for Best Actress.

References

External links

1980s Japanese films
1989 horror films
1989 films
Japanese horror films